Santa Catarina State University (UDESC) is a State Public University in Brazil. It was established in 1965.

UDESC is located in Santa Catarina state in southern Brazil, primarily in Florianópolis and Joinville, but it has multiple campuses in 10 cities. According to its official website, it has over 13,000 students.
It is regarded as one of the best state Universities in Brazil.

Areas of concentration
UDESC boasts a wide variety of academic areas of concentration, both scientific and artistic.

Its Arts division (Centro de Artes) is known by the abbreviation CEART. Subdivisions of study there are primarily in: performing arts, visual arts, design, fashion, and music.

Notes

External links
Official website (in Portuguese)
English language page

State universities in Brazil
Educational institutions established in 1965
Universidade do Estado de Santa Catarina
Universidade do Estado de Santa Catarina
1965 establishments in Brazil
Joinville
Balneário Camboriú